The Nations Cup 1969–70 was the tenth edition of a European rugby union championship for national teams, and fifth with the formula and the name of "Nations Cup".

The tournament was won by France.

First division 
Table

Czechoslovakia relegated to division 2
 Results

Second

Pool 1 

 Table

Results

Pool 2
Table

Results

Final
Results

Bibliography 
 Francesco Volpe, Valerio Vecchiarelli (2000), 2000 Italia in Meta, Storia della nazionale italiana di rugby dagli albori al Sei Nazioni, GS Editore (2000) 
 Francesco Volpe, Paolo Pacitti (Author), Rugby 2000, GTE Gruppo Editorale (1999).

References

External links
 FIRA-AER official website

1969–70 in European rugby union
1969–70
1969 rugby union tournaments for national teams
1970 rugby union tournaments for national teams